Christine Nzeyimana is a Burundian judge. From 2007 to 2013 she was president of the Constitutional Court of Burundi.

Christine Nzeyimana was a judge on Burundi's Supreme Court. In 2006 she was one of the three judges who decided the case of former president Domitien Ndayizeye, former vice-president Alphonse Kadege, and the five others accused of "threatening state security".

Nzeyimana has no party affiliation. She is married to the diplomat Adolphe Nahayo.

References

Year of birth missing (living people)
Living people
Burundian judges
Constitutional court judges
Constitutional court women judges
Burundian women lawyers